Philo Vance's Secret Mission is a 1947 American mystery film directed by Reginald Le Borg and starring Alan Curtis, Sheila Ryan and Tala Birell. It was part of a series of films featuring the detective Philo Vance made during the 1930s and 1940s.

The film's sets were designed by the art directors Edward C. Jewell and Perry Smith.

Synopsis
Philo Vance is approached by the head of a publishing company to become an advisor on a series of crime novels they are releasing. Before long he is embroiled in a case about the mysterious killing of one of the partners in the company.

Cast
 Alan Curtis as Philo Vance 
 Sheila Ryan as Mona Bannister 
 Tala Birell as Mrs. Elizabeth Phillips 
 Frank Jenks as Ernie Clark 
 James Bell as Sheriff Harry Madison 
 Frank Fenton as Paul Morgan 
 Paul Maxey as Martin Jamison 
 Kenneth Farrell as Joe, the Photographer 
 Toni Todd as Louise Roberts aka Mrs. Paul Morgan 
 David Leonard as Carl Wilson 
 William Newell as Deputy 
 Tom Quinn as Haddon Phillips 
 Harry Strang as Ship's Purser  
 Frank Wilcox as Thaddius Carter

References

Bibliography
 Backer, Ron. Mystery Movie Series of 1930s Hollywood. McFarland, 2012.

External links
 

1947 films
1947 mystery films
American mystery films
Films directed by Reginald Le Borg
Producers Releasing Corporation films
Eagle-Lion Films films
American black-and-white films
1940s English-language films
1940s American films
Philo Vance films